The men's team pursuit speed skating competition of the 2014 Sochi Olympics was held at Adler Arena Skating Center on 21 and 22 February 2014. The distance was 3,200 metres.

Qualification
A total of eight teams of three or four speed skaters could qualify for this team event. The top 6 of the 2013–14 ISU Speed Skating World Cup – Men's team pursuit standings after the World Cup race in Berlin secured a spot in the Olympics. Of the teams outside the top six, France qualified based on the time ranking and Russia qualified as hosts. A reserve list was also made.

Records
Prior to this competition, the existing world and Olympic records were as follows.

At the 2013 World Single Distance Speed Skating Championships the track record was at 3:42.03 by the team of the Netherlands consisting of Jan Blokhuijsen, Sven Kramer, and Koen Verweij.

The following records were set during this competition.

OR = Olympic record, TR = track record

Results
On 24 November 2017, the Russian team were disqualified after Aleksandr Rumyantsev was sanctioned for a doping violation. On 22 December, Ivan Skobrev was disqualified as well. In January 2018, they successfully appealed against the lifetime ban as well as decision to disqualify them from Sochi Olympics at the court of arbitration for sport. Their results were reinstated.

Bracket

Quarterfinals
The quarterfinals were held on 21 February.

TR = track record

Semifinals
The semifinals were held on 21 February.

TR = track record

Finals
The finals were held on 22 February.

OR = Olympic record, TR = track record

References

Men's speed skating at the 2014 Winter Olympics